St Edward's School Boat Club is a rowing club on the River Thames based at St Edwards School Boathouse on Godstow Road, Oxford, Oxfordshire. It is the rowing club belonging to St Edward's School, Oxford (also known as Teddies).

History

Rowing is one of the sports available for pupils as an extracurricular activity at the School. Old St Edwards or OSE (former pupils) have their own rowing club called the Martyrs. The club is responsible for the founding of the National Schools' Regatta which was first raced in 1947 as the "Colts and Third Eights Regatta". A teacher called Desmond Hill who was responsible for the rowing at the School invited teams from Shrewsbury, Bedford and Radley to race against St. Edwards in Godstow. The club has won the coveted 'Triple' (Princess Elizabeth Challenge Cup at Henley Royal Regatta, the Queen Mother Cup at the National Schools' Regatta and the Schools' Head of the River Race) on one occasion in 1984.

Honours

National champions

Key
M men, O open, W women, +coxed, -coxless, x sculls, J junior, 18 16 age group

Schools' Head of the River

National Schools' Regatta

Henley Royal Regatta

See also
Rowing on the River Thames

References

Sport in Oxfordshire
Sport in Oxford
Organisations based in Oxford
Buildings and structures in Oxford
Buildings and structures on the River Thames
Rowing clubs in England
Rowing clubs in Oxfordshire
Rowing clubs of the River Thames
Scholastic rowing in the United Kingdom